Initao, officially the Municipality of Initao, is a 3rd class municipality in the province of Misamis Oriental, Philippines. According to the 2020 census, it has a population of 33,902 people.

The nearest primary road network is the Butuan–Cagayan de Oro–Iligan Road. The nearest airport is Laguindingan International Airport located 39 minutes away towards Cagayan de Oro.

HazardHunterPh app assessment on seismic hazard marks the town safe from ground rupture, prone to ground shaking and generally susceptible to liquefaction. Volcanic Hazard assessment mainly identifies it as having no immediate volcanic hazard threat base on its location to the nearest active volcano. However, it has high susceptibility to flooding at 1 to 2 meters flood height and lasting for more than 3 days.

Economic activity in the area is mainly dependent on fishing, agriculture, retail, tourism and government services such as The Misamis Oriental Provincial Hospital-Initao, Regional Trial Court Branch 44, Initao-Libertad 8th Municipal Circuit Trial Court, Initao College, the BJMP, DENR, DepEd etc. According to the Bureau of Local Government Finance, the annual regular revenue of Initao for the fiscal year of 2016 was ₱98,017,030.37.

Tourism sites include the Initao-Libertad Protected Landscape and Seascape which locals simply call "lasang" or forest in the local dialect, various beaches dotting its shorelines and recent additions of agritourism sites developed by locals.

Significant town celebrations include the town fiesta celebrated by Roman Catholics in honor of the Patron Saint Francis Xavier which is held every December 2 and 3 although the celebration stretches for a week. Various festivals promoting tourism are also being spearheaded by the LGU and the Provincial Government of Misamis Oriental.

History

Based on the research report submitted by L.M. Neri, A.M.M. Ragrario, E.C.R. Robles, and A.J. Carlos, the original settlers of Initao were the Bukidnons. They were described as warlike and aggressive and ready to sacrifice their lives in defending their territory. It is said that the early community in Initao was ruled by three (3) brothers named Datu Hukom, Datu Tamparong, and Datu Pulagoyan, who had to protect early settlers in Initao against Moro invasions in the sixteenth century.

Because of the frequent threat by the Moro pirates, the people of Initao became war-like. They were considered to be /hot-blooded/ and /hot-tempered/ fearless fighters. Hence, the word Initao comes from the word init which means “hot” and tao which means “people.” They were people perpetually prepared to fight their enemy to defend their territory and community. Legend also has it that the Moro raiders were defeated, the people planted bamboo along the Initao River as a symbol of peace and truce among them.

The word Initao, originally spelled by the Spaniards as Ynitao, was mentioned on August 6, 1838, in the inventory of livestock, fruits, exotic and cereal plants in the Provincia de Misamis (Ereccion de Pueblos, Misamis 1808–1839). In May 1858, Ynitao was headed by Gobernadorcillo Francisco Antonio and succeeded by Gobernadorcillo Abariano Caburratan in 1894.

In 1838, Initao was a Spanish pueblo composed of 3 cabecerias (Ereccion de Pueblos, Misamis 1808–1839). On October 27, 1877, Ynitao had 7 cabecerias which became 8 on June 30, 1882. It was decreased to 1 cabeceria, known as Apas, on June 30, 1883, until 1884 with a total population of 1,514. On June 30, 1887, Ynitao again increased its number of cabeceria to 19 and decreased to 12 on October 3, 1892.

In 1896–1902, Ynitao was in the province of Lanao. In 1903, Initao once again became a pueblo. The municipality is one of the oldest in the western part of Misamis Oriental.

In 1957, the barrio of Naawan, then part of Initao, was constituted into the town of Naawan.

Moreover, the municipalities of Manticao and Lugait were once part of Initao until 1948.

Geography

Barangays

Initao is politically subdivided into 16 barangays.
 Aluna
 Andales
 Apas
 Calacapan
 Gimangpang
 Jampason
 Kamelon
 Kanitoan
 Oguis
 Pagahan
 Poblacion
 Pontacon
 San Pedro
 Sinalac
 Tawantawan
 Tubigan

Climate

Demographics

Economy

Tourism

 Lasang Secret Adventure is a 57-hectare natural forest with diverse flora and fauna located within the Initao–Libertad Protected Landscape and Seascape, accessible via the National Highway (Cagayan de Oro to Iligan) that snakes through the forest. Attractions and activities include split-nose bats, caves, spelunking, fishing, swimming, snorkeling, scuba diving and diving from the high steep rock surface down to the sea water. Facilities for overnight stays are present.

A variety of different corals dominate the underwater environment and a wide variety of fish can be found making home amidst it. Tourists interested in a snorkeling safari can camp or rent cottages located in the park.

Insfrastructure

Transportation
Initao can be reached by plane through Laguindingan Airport. From the airport one can choose to ride a coaster, taxi or a bus. Travel time is 30 minutes west. Like any other in the province of Misamis Oriental town, the National Highway snakes through it. Visitors and locals can go around the town by just hailing a "sikad-sikad", a habal-habal, a motorboat or a jeepney.

Communication
PLDT Home Fibr, Globe, TM, Smart and Sun are serviceable in this town. DITO Telecommunity lines have also been constructed to cater customers in the event of its activation.

Education
 Initao Central School is a public elementary school. There are elementary schools in almost every barangay in this town.
 Initao National Comprehensive High School is a public secondary school. The school has a playing field where soccer matches are held occasionally and soccer practice by local enthusiasts is held almost every afternoon.
 Xavier Academy High School is a Catholic school. It is very strict on disciplinary and religious activities. The school is known for its formality and extracurricular activities like the Xavier on the Runway and Pinoy Big Teacher with its champion III-St.Ignatius '09-'10. Its teacher to student ratio is an ideal alternative to the sometimes overcrowded public high school.
 Initao College is twelve years in operation. This college was recently revived and it was CHED recognized college on the year 2015. The school campus is located in Purok 2A, Jampason. The courses offered are Bachelor in Elementary Education (BEEd), B.S. Business Administration (BSBA), and B.S. in Hotel and Restaurant Management (BSHRM).

References

External links

 [ Philippine Standard Geographic Code]
Philippine Census Information
Local Governance Performance Management System 

Municipalities of Misamis Oriental